H.R. 2289, the full title of which is To rename section 219(c) of the Internal Revenue Code of 1986 as the Kay Bailey Hutchison Spousal IRA is a bill that was introduced in the United States House of Representatives during the 113th United States Congress.  If passed, the bill would rename one section of the Internal Revenue Code after former U.S. Senator Kay Bailey Hutchison.

Background
Kay Bailey Hutchison served as a senator from Texas from June 14, 1993 to January 3, 2013.  During that time, she was heavily involved in changing the tax code so that married women working from home could open IRA savings accounts.  She considered this one of the accomplishments in Congress that she was the most proud of.

Provisions/Elements of the bill
This summary is based largely on the summary provided by the Congressional Research Service, a public domain source.

This bill would amend the Internal Revenue Code to rename the section heading of Internal Revenue Code provisions relating to the individual retirement accounts (IRAs) of married individuals as the Kay Bailey Hutchison Spousal IRA.

Procedural history
H.R. 2289 was introduced into the House on June 6, 2013 by Rep. Sam Johnson (R-TX).  It was referred to the United States House Committee on Ways and Means.  On June 25, 2013, the House agreed by voice vote to pass the bill.  It was sent to the United States Senate and referred to the United States Senate Committee on Finance.

See also
List of bills in the 113th United States Congress
Kay Bailey Hutchison
Internal Revenue Code

Notes/References

External links

Library of Congress - Thomas H.R. 2289
beta.congress.gov H.R. 2289
GovTrack.us H.R. 2289
OpenCongress.org H.R. 2289
House Republicans' Legislative Digest on H.R. 2289

Acts of the 113th United States Congress